Federal Government Girls College, Akure (FEGGICOLLA) is a Federal Government owned secondary school, run by the Federal Ministry of Education. It is an all girls' secondary school situated in Akure the capital city of Ondo State, Nigeria.

History 
Federal Government Girls College, Akure was founded on 28 October 1977.

References 

Secondary schools in Nigeria
Government schools in Nigeria